The Bogs Adornado Philippine Basketball Association (PBA) Comeback Player of the Year is an annual Philippine Basketball Association (PBA) award given from 1993 PBA season up to 2016–17 PBA season, and from 2021 PBA season up to present. The winner receives the Bogs Adornado Trophy, which is named since 2010 in honor of William "Bogs" Adornado, a multiple time PBA most valuable player awardee who won his third MVP trophy in 1981 coming from a career-threatening knee injury in 1976 that forced him on the sidelines for two years. Unlike the traditional player awards, which is given by the league, this citation is awarded by the PBA Press Corps.

Since its inception, the award has been given to 20 individuals. The most recent award winner is June Mar Fajardo of the San Miguel Beermen.

Winners

References

Philippine Basketball Association awards
Awards established in 1993
1993 establishments in the Philippines